Paola Borboni (1 January 1900 – 9 April 1995) was an Italian stage and film actress whose career spanned nine decades of cinema.

Early life 
Borboni was born on 1 January 1900 in Parma, Italy.

Career 
Borboni made her stage debut in 1916, beginning to take minor film roles soon afterwards. She entered film in 1916 in the silent picture Jacobo Ortis directed by Giuseppe Sterni, and made over 80 film appearances between then and 1990.

Appearing in several silent films before 1921 she was absent from cinema for some 14 years during which time she made numerous stage appearances. She gained notoriety in 1925 when she appeared topless in a stage performance of Carlo Veneziani’s Alga Marina as a mermaid, exposing her breasts. She returned to the silver screen in 1936 in the Mario Mattoli film L' Uomo che sorride.

She went on to appear in films such as the Carlo Lizzani-directed film Ai margini della metropoli in 1952 in which she appeared alongside the main cast of Massimo Girotti, Marina Berti and Giulietta Masina. Between 1936 and 1956 her career was at its peak and her roles gradually became less numerous in the decades that followed, making a final appearance in the Giorgio Mosa film Blue dolphin - l'avventura continua in 1990.

Death 
Borboni died of a stroke, aged 95, on 9 April 1995.

Selected filmography

Jacopo Ortis (1918)
Il furto del sentimento (1919)
Il bacio di un re (1919)
Il principe idiota (1920)
Gli artigli d'acciaio (1920)
Sinfonia pastorale (1921)
L'ora della morte (1921)
The Amnesiac (1936) - Erminia Nardelli-Buzzi
To Live (1936) - Emma
L'uomo che sorride (1937) - La contessa
Nina non far la stupida (1937, di Nunzio Malasomma) - Cate - la governante
I've Lost My Husband! (1939, di Enrico Guazzoni) - Valentina
Wealth Without a Future (1940, di Ferdinando Maria Poggioli) - Carolina Barra
Il sogno di tutti (1940, di Oreste Biancoli) - La portinaia
Giorno di nozze (1942, di Raffaello Matarazzo) - Elena - Amedeo's wife
Il nemico (1943, di Guglielmo Giannini) - Clara Korsen
Il birichino di papà (1943, di Raffaello Matarazzo) - La direttrice del collegio
Annabella's Adventure (1943, di Leo Menardi) - La madre di Annabella
La vita torna (1943, di Pier Luigi Faraldo) - La signora Lorini, madre di Elena
Il viaggio del signor Perrichon (1943, di Paolo Moffa) - La signora Perrichon
 A Little Wife (1943, di Giorgio Bianchi)
The Materassi Sisters (1944, di Ferdinando Maria Poggioli) - La principessa russa
The Innkeeper (1944, di Luigi Chiarini) - Dejanira, l'attrice
Finalmente sì (1944, di ) - Zia Letizia
Il ventesimo duca (1945, di Lucio De Caro) - La principessa di Danimarca
La freccia nel fianco (1945, di Alberto Lattuada) - La baronessa Masiero
La resa di Titì (1945, di Giorgio Bianchi)
I'll Sing No More (1945, di Riccardo Freda) - L'impresaria teatrale Greta Arden
The Models of Margutta (1946) - La moglie di Andrea
Cavalcade of Heroes (1950, di Mario Costa) - La marchesa Ferrari
E' più facile che un cammello.. (1950, di Luigi Zampa) - Luisa, la sorella di Carlo Bacchi
Song of Spring (1951, di Mario Costa) - Lidia
Rome 11:00 (1952, di Giuseppe De Santis) - Matilde
Final Pardon (1952, di Renato Polselli)
Lulù (1953, di Fernando Cerchio) - Virginia
At the Edge of the City (1953, di Carlo Lizzani) - Madre di Luisa
Roman Holiday (1953, di William Wyler) - Charwoman
I Vitelloni (1953, di Federico Fellini) - Signora Rubini
Gelosia (1953, di Pietro Germi) - La zia baronessa
François il contrabbandiere (1953, di Gianfranco Parolini) - Pamela, la governante
Mamma perdonami (1953, di Giuseppe Vari) - Madre di Luisa
Siamo ricchi e poveri (1953, di Siro Marcellini)
Il bacio dell'Aurora (1953)
What Scoundrels Men Are! (1953, di Glauco Pellegrini) - madre di Bruno
Condannatelo (1953, di Luigi Capuano)
C'era una volta Angelo Musco (1953, di Giorgio Chili) - (archive footage)
Amori di mezzo secolo (1954, di Glauco Pellegrini) - Countess Matilde Micheli (segment "L'amore romantico")
Terza liceo (1954, di Luciano Emmer) - Madre di Bruno Sacchi
Città canora (1954, di Mario Costa) - Anna
Santarellina (1954, di Yves Allégret) - Rosa
On Trial (1954, di Julien Duvivier) - Mme Bobika
Knights of the Queen (1954, di Mauro Bolognini) - Maria Queen of France
Red and Black (1954, di Domenico Paolella)
Casta Diva (1954, di Carmine Gallone) - Signora Monti
The Best Part (1955) - Bit part (uncredited)
Mi permette babbo (1956, di Mario Bonnard) - Sonia d'Aragona
L'oro di Roma (1961, di Carlo Lizzani) - Rosa
I complessi (1965, di Franco Rossi) - Baracchi-Croce (segment "Il Complesso della Schiava nubiana")
Menage all'italiana (1965, di Franco Indovina) - Carmelina's Mother
La ragazzola (1965, di Giuseppe Orlandini) - Elvira
Una vergine per il principe (1966, di Pasquale Festa Campanile) - La signora
Arabella (1967, di Mauro Bolognini) - Duchess Moretti
Colpo grosso alla napoletana (1968, di Ken Annakin) - Signora Rosa
Quando le donne avevano la coda (1970, di Pasquale Festa Campanile) - Leader of Cavewoman Tribe
All'ovest di Sacramento (1971, di Federico Chentrens) - Victoria
Per grazia ricevuta (1971, di Nino Manfredi) - Immacolata
Le belve (1971, di Gianni Grimaldi) - Mother of fachiro (segment "Il fachiro")
Sesso matto (1973, di Dino Risi) - Esperia / ('Non è mai troppo tardi')
Bello cone un arcangelo (1974, di Alfredo Giannetti) - Donna Mercedes
Paolo Barca maestro elementare praticamente nudista (1975, di Flavio Mogherini) - Nonna di Paolo
Nerone (1977, di Pier Francesco Pingitore) - Agrippina
L'albero della maldicenza (1979, di Giacinto Bonaquisti) - La Contessa
Suor Omicidi (1979, di Giulio Berruti)
Il vizietto 2 (1980, di Eduard Molinaro) - Mrs. Baldi
The Lady of the Camellias (1981)
Yes, Giorgio (1982, di Franklyn Schaffener) - Sister Theresa
Cicciabomba (1982, di Umberto Lenzi) - Miris grandmother
Più bello di così si muore (1982, di Pasquale Festa Campanile)
Occhio, malocchio, prezzemolo e finocchio (1983, di Sergio Martino) - Marchesa del Querceto
Amarsi un pò (1984, di Carlo Vanzina)
Vacanze in America (1984, di Carlo Vanzina)
Blue Dolphin (1990, di Giorgio Moser) - Nonna Giulia (final film role)

Notes and references

External links
 

Italian film actresses
Italian stage actresses
Italian silent film actresses
Actors from Parma
1900 births
1995 deaths
20th-century Italian actresses